Division No. 1, Subdivision D is an unorganized subdivision on the Avalon Peninsula in Newfoundland and Labrador, Canada. It is in Division 1 and contains the unincorporated communities of Flatrock, Neils Pond and Three Island Pond.

Newfoundland and Labrador subdivisions